Jeff Varem (born 16 July 1983) is a Nigerian professional basketball player. He formerly played for the Sioux Falls Skyforce of the NBA Development League. He also played as an import for the Coca-Cola Tigers and the Barako Bull Energy Boosters in the Philippine Basketball Association.

External links
 Jeff Varem nba.com
 Jeff Varem cstv.com

1983 births
Living people
ASVEL Basket players
Élan Béarnais players
Philippine Basketball Association imports
Power forwards (basketball)
Nigerian men's basketball players
Nigerian expatriate basketball people in the United States
Sioux Falls Skyforce players
Small forwards
Tulsa 66ers players
Vincennes Trailblazers men's basketball players
Washington State Cougars men's basketball players
Powerade Tigers players
Barako Bull Energy Boosters players
Philippine Basketball Association All-Stars
2006 FIBA World Championship players
Nigerian expatriate basketball people in the Philippines